Dunderberg, which is a Swedish word meaning "thunder(ing) mountain", was an ocean-going casemate ironclad of 14 guns built for the Union Navy. She resembled an enlarged, two-masted version of the Confederate casemate ironclad . She was originally designed to have both gun turrets and a casemate but the turrets were deleted while the ship was still being built. Construction began in 1862, but progress was slow and she was not launched until after the end of the American Civil War in 1865.

The ship was not accepted by the Union Navy so her builder began seeking buyers elsewhere; Otto von Bismarck expressed some interest, and the thought of Prussia armed with such a vessel prompted France to purchase her and commission her in 1867 with the name Rochambeau. She was initially placed in reserve, but was mobilized in 1870 to participate in the Franco-Prussian War. The ship saw no action and was decommissioned after the end of the war. Rochambeau was stricken from the Navy Directory in 1872 and scrapped in 1874.

Design, description and construction
The ship was to be completed in 15 months at a cost of $1,250,000.

Now named Dunderberg by Webb, the contract was amended on 27 August to specify her armor scheme. The main deck, from the rear of the casemate to the stern, was to consist of 4.5-inch armor plates that tapered to 2.5 inches in thickness. Dunderberg was to be given a complete double bottom and her engine and boiler rooms were to be completely enclosed by watertight bulkheads. She was also to be provided with two masts and the appropriate rigging.

The engines, designed to produce , and boilers were both subcontracted by Webb to the Etna Iron Works of New York City. She had two auxiliary boilers to provide steam for the steam engines that powered her pumps, ventilation fans and rotated the gun turrets. All of the boilers exhausted through a retractable funnel.

Her keel was laid down before 3 October 1862 at Webb's shipyard in New York City, even though Webb was forced to use unseasoned oak for Dunderberg because the supply of seasoned timber had been exhausted earlier in the war. Unseasoned wood was far more prone to rot and significantly shortened the ship's life. Her hull was very strongly built with the space between her frames filled with timber and diagonal iron straps tied her frames together. These changes made her the longest wooden ship ever built. Dunderbergs hull was protected from biofouling by two external layers of zinc and copper. The ship was fitted with two rudders, the primary one in the usual location aft of the propeller, but she also had an auxiliary rudder placed in the deadwood above and ahead of the propeller.

Many other changes were made to Dunderberg while she was under construction and significantly contributed to her delays in completion. The most important of these was the eventual elimination of her turrets which began in October 1863 when Webb wrote to Gideon Welles, Secretary of the Navy, saying that he concurred with the General Superintendent of Ironclads, Rear Admiral Francis Gregory's suggestion that the "turrets be dispensed with and the casemate lengthened to accommodate an additional number of guns" Welles did not approve the change until September 1864 when he authorized an armament of four 15-inch and twelve 11-inch guns in the casemate. It was provided with a total of 22 gun ports, six on each broadside, two on each corner and one each facing the bow and stern. The design of the gun ports was another issue that took years to resolve. The mounting of the much larger 15-inch Dahlgren gun in the casemate further complicated the design of the gun ports, especially since the design for their carriages was not even finished until May 1866. The design of the gunport itself was revised in the second half of 1865 to reduce the chance of projectiles entering them; the new design was roughly hourglass shaped and narrower in the middle of the casemate than on either the inside or the outside of the gun port. All of these changes to the gun ports delayed the completion of the casemate's woodwork as well as the cutting and installation of the casemate armor. The angle of the casemate was also changed from the original very shallow 35° from the horizontal to an angle of 60° after Rear Admiral Joseph Smith, Chief of the Bureau of Yards and Docks, noted that it would be very difficult to work the guns at such an angle. The deletion of the turrets also required a redesign of the conning tower as Webb had intended to mount it on top of the fore turret. A copy of that used by the  monitors was installed between the funnel and the foremast during August 1866.

Dunderberg was built with a plough-shaped , ram bow of which the forward  were sheathed in cast iron. Her full armament was not installed before she was sold, but gunnery trials were conducted in February 1867 with two 15-inch and four 11-inch guns. The 15-inch guns could traverse 30° forward of the beam and 28° aft and the 11-inch Dahlgrens could bear 28° to both sides. The only significant problem encountered during the trials was that the gun deck was made of soft pine and did not withstand the force of recoil well.

Other problems that delayed the ship's completion were shortages of material, labor and money. Prices for pig iron and bar iron nearly tripled while boiler plate and copper roughly doubled. Wages of even inexperienced workers increased between 50 and 100 percent. The New York City draft riots in July 1863 and several machinist's strikes further slowed progress on Dunderberg. Webb failed to account for these problems when negotiating the ship's contract and he repeatedly tried to charge the Navy for alterations as well as use cheaper materials to reduce his costs. He also attempted to have his contract amended by act of Congress, but he was unsuccessful. The Navy agreed to pay for some of the changes made and it also reduced the reserve amount held back in case the
ship did not meet her specifications in 1865.

By about 1864, both sides regarded the ship as a white elephant; Welles wrote in his diary that he would rather have the money than the ship and Webb was spending more money than he could anticipate from the contract. Nonetheless, he continued work on the Dunderberg as he had very little other work for his shipyard and, most importantly, in the hope of getting his contract amended to allow him to make a profit. On 22 July 1865, he launched the ship, now with her hull complete and about half of her armor installed, with much fanfare. The New York Times estimated a crowd of 20,000 watched the launching. The following year, the government rejected offers by Peru and Chile to purchase the ship, both then at war with Spain, lest the sale prejudice its lawsuit against Great Britain for selling warships to the Confederacy. Webb did manage to get a private bill passed by Congress in March 1867 that allowed him title to the ship once he repaid all monies advanced to him.

French service
After Prussia expressed an interest in the ship, the Emperor of France, Napoleon III, bought her in April for 2.5 million dollars over the objections of his own navy, which preferred a home-built ship. The exact date of purchase is unknown, but Welles noted in his diary on 7 May that Webb had told him of the sale. On 27 June, Webb refunded the money that had been paid to him and also purchased those items furnished by the government. A little over a week later, he attempted to sail to France, but had to return to port the following day due to engine problems. These were not resolved until 19 July when he, and his entire family, set sail. Dunderberg arrived at Cherbourg on 3 August and the French Navy took possession three days later.

The ship was commissioned and renamed Rochambeau, in honor of the Comte de Rochambeau, a general during the American Revolution, on 7 August. After briefly running machinery trials two days later, Rochambeau began an overhaul in the naval dockyard at Cherbourg to fix problems that had become apparent during her delivery voyage and to modify her in accordance with French practices. These changes included the addition of a pilothouse on top of the conning tower, the replacement of the main rudder and the length of her stern was reduced somewhat. Her armament was removed and replaced by four Canon de 270 Modèle 1864/66 and 10 Canon de 240 Modèle 1864/66 guns, both of which were breech-loading. The 270 mm guns were mounted in the corners of the casemate and could pivot between a broadside gun port and one on the corner. Eight of the 240 mm guns were mounted on the broadside and the remaining two were positioned in the bow and stern gun ports. The remaining four gunports, those on the corners closest to the broadside, were plated over.

The French carefully measured the ship during her 1868 overhaul.

They measured the ship's armor thickness throughout. The casemate was completely protected by  plates. In service, Rochambeau proved to be very wet and threw up a lot of spray in a head sea. Under sail alone in a good breeze, the ship could not maintain her course, could not be steered and would turn until wind and wave were on her beam.
 
Rochambeau completed her refit on 18 May 1868 and was briefly under the command of Captain (Capitaine de vaisseau) Jules-François-Émile Krantz (a future Minister of Marine) before being decommissioned on 1 August and placed in reserve. She was refitted from August to December and had her forward hull armor plates replaced by a one-piece cast iron ram. Still in reserve in 1869, Rochambeau was modified with an additional 240 mm pivot gun mounted over the forward end of the casemate and the pine planking underneath the guns in the casemate was replaced by oak.

The ship was recommissioned with a crew of 600 men in mid-July 1870, just before the beginning of the Franco-Prussian War. She departed Cherbourg on 25 August to join the fleet in Danish waters and reached Copenhagen on 31 August. The fleet fruitlessly cruised the Baltic Sea for several weeks before they were ordered home on 16 September. Rochambeaus shallow draft meant that she and the armored corvette  were ordered to search the mouth of the Jade Estuary on 26 September for Prussian ships, but they found nothing.

Upon her return, Rochambeau was decommissioned again and her crew was ordered to help defend Paris. The ship was stricken from the Navy List (Liste de la Flotte) on 15 April 1872 and was scrapped sometime in 1874.

Notes

Footnotes

References

External links

Ships built in New York City
Ships built by William H. Webb
1865 ships
Ironclad warships of the French Navy